Behjatabad may refer to:

Behjatabad, East Azerbaijan
Behjatabad, Kerman
Behjatabad, Mazandaran
Behjatabad, Qazvin
Behjatabad, Sistan and Baluchestan